Patrick Joseph "Paddy" Ryan (1904 – 1969), an Australian Catholic priest and anti-communist organiser, was born in Albury, New South Wales in 1904. He was ordained as a priest in the order of the Missionaries of the Sacred Heart in 1929. After gaining a doctorate in Rome, he returned to Australia and for many years taught philosophy at the order's seminary in Kensington, New South Wales. His philosophy was strictly neo-scholastic and he vigorously debated the atheist philosophers of Sydney University.

Life and career
During 1940-1, he took over the 'Question Box' program on radio 2SM while the regular presenter, his colleague Dr Rumble, was touring America.

He was the principal founder and head in Sydney of the `Movement', the semi-secret Catholic anti-communist organisation that struggled with communism for control of the union movement in the late 1940s and early 1950s, thus being the counterpart of B.A. Santamaria in Melbourne. After the Australian Labor Party split of 1955, however, he, like the majority of Sydney Labor supporters, followed the A.L.P. instead of the new Democratic Labor Party.

Ryan frequently engaged in polemics with Communists and Communist apologists.   His most prominent public activity was a debate in 1948 in Sydney with Edgar Ross of the Communist Party of Australia on `Whether Communism is in the best interests of the Australian people'. An audience of 30,000 heard a vigorous debate.  Communist Party president Lance Sharkey replied to Ryan's attacks.  Ryan's many anti-Communist speeches in the next few years helped create the strong Australian Catholic tradition of anti-communism.

In 1943 Ryan accidentally shot and killed a man he mistook for a rabbit; the coroner found he was blameless. He died in 1969.

References

External links

Australian Dictionary of Biography article on Ryan

J. Franklin, Catholic Values and Australian Realities (Connor Court Publishing, 2006), ch. 2.

1904 births
1969 deaths
People from Albury, New South Wales
20th-century Australian Roman Catholic priests
Missionaries of the Sacred Heart
Australian anti-communists
Australian philosophers
Pontifical Gregorian University alumni